Hypsipyla robusta, the cedar tip moth, is a species of snout moth in the genus Hypsipyla. It was described by Frederic Moore in 1886. It is found from Africa (including Madagascar), throughout Asia (including Sri Lanka and India) to Australia. Several undescribed species or subspecies might be involved.

The wingspan is about 30 mm. Adults have brown forewings with a faint zigzag pattern and buff hindwings, both with dark veins.

The larvae attack a wide range of Meliaceae species (including Toona ciliata, Chukrasia tabularis, Swietenia species and Khaya species) and feed in shoots as well as fruits, flowers, and in bark. In Australia, robusta or an extremely similar-looking species has recently been reared from fruit of Xylocarpus granatum.

References

Moths described in 1886
Phycitini
Moths of Mauritius
Moths of Africa
Moths of Madagascar
Moths of Asia
Moths of Australia